Otago are a New Zealand professional rugby union team based in Dunedin, New Zealand. The union was originally established in 1881, with the National Provincial Championship established in 1976. They now play in the reformed National Provincial Championship competition. They play their home games at Forsyth Barr Stadium in Dunedin in the Otago region. The team is affiliated with the Highlanders Super Rugby franchise. Their home playing colours are navy blue.

Current squad

The Otago squad for the 2022 Bunnings NPC is:

Honours

Otago have been overall Champions twice, winning the titles in 1991 and 1998. Their full list of honours include:

National Provincial Championship First Division
Winners: 1991, 1998

Current Super Rugby players
Players named in the 2022 Otago squad, who also earned contracts or were named in a squad for any side participating in the 2022 Super Rugby Pacific season.

References

External links
Official site

National Provincial Championship
New Zealand rugby union teams
Sport in Otago